The Mallorca Files is a British police procedural television drama series set on the Spanish island of Mallorca, starring Elen Rhys and Julian Looman. The series, broadcast on BBC One, was created by Dan Sefton. It focuses on the Welsh Miranda Blake (Rhys), and German Max Winter (Looman) as they solve crimes on the Spanish island of Mallorca. The series broadcasts on BBC One on weekday afternoons. It was broadcast in France on the France 2 channel in June 2020.

A second series was confirmed on 11 November 2019, before the first episode was broadcast. Series 2 aired on BBC One from 1 February 2021 and all episodes were available on BBC iPlayer from that date. The third series is currently in production, with filming starting on location in Palma in early March 2023.

Synopsis
Total opposites Miranda Blake, a Welsh Detective Constable with London's Metropolitan Police, and Max Winter, a German detective, are teamed up by Inés Villegas, the Chief of Palma Police, to solve crimes, generally ones committed against the international community, on the island of Mallorca. Usually Inés gives them cases with less importance as the detectives are not Spanish.

Cast
 Elen Rhys as Detective Miranda Blake
 Julian Looman as Detective Max Winter
 María Fernández Ache as Chief Inés Villegas
 Nacho Aldeguer as Federico Ramis, forensic pathologist (Series 1)
 Alex Hafner as Roberto Herrero, forensic pathologist (Series 2—)
 Nansi Nsue as Luisa Rosa, forensic assistant (Series 2—)
 Tábata Cerezo as Carmen Lorenzo, Max's girlfriend

Recurring cast
 Denis Schmidt as Christian, Max's best friend
 Carlos Olalla as Joan Lorenzo, Carmen's father
 Tanya Moodie as Supt. Abbey Palmer, Blake's former boss (Series 1)

Production
The series is a co-production between Cosmopolitan Pictures, Clerkenwell Films, BritBox US and Canada, ZDFneo and France 2.

Cosmopolitan Pictures founder Ben Donald said the series came from "[a] desire to create a feel-good action-driven cop show like the ones I grew up with and, secondly, a desire to rebrand and refresh the Anglo-German relationship on television." Filming for the first series started in November 2018.

Filming on the second series was interrupted due to the COVID-19 pandemic. Only six of the planned ten episodes were produced. Despite announcements prior to the series premiere, Nacho Aldeguer and Tanya Moodie did not return to the series, even though Moodie had become a regular cast member. Episodes penned by Rachael New, Alex McBride, Jackie Okwera and Emily Fairweather were written for the series, with Rob Evans signed on to direct. The unfilmed episodes are expected to be carried over into the third series should it be commissioned. Producer Ben Donald stated that post-production on the six finished episodes was completed in August 2020. Phil Daniels and Josette Simon were later confirmed amongst the guest actors cast.

Episodes

Series 1 (2019)

Series 2 (2021)

Soundtrack

A soundtrack consisting of music from series one of The Mallorca Files was digitally released in February 2020. Music on the album was composed by Charlie Mole, and included guest vocals from Anna Ross who performs on the show's title and closing tracks.

References

External links
 
 
 

2019 British television series debuts
2010s British crime drama television series
2020s British crime drama television series
2020s British mystery television series
BBC crime television shows
BBC television dramas
Detective television series
English-language television shows
Television shows set in the Balearic Islands
BBC Daytime television series
Television series by Clerkenwell Films
Television series by BBC Studios